David Leslie Hoggan (March 23, 1923 – August 7, 1988) was an American  author of The Forced War: When Peaceful Revision Failed and other works in the German and English languages. He was antisemitic, maintained a close association with various neo-Nazi groups, chose a publishing house run by an unregenerate Nazi, and engaged in Holocaust denial.

Early life
Hoggan was born in Portland, Oregon, and received his education at Reed College and Harvard University. At Harvard, Hoggan was awarded a PhD in 1948 for a dissertation on relations between Germany and Poland in the years 1938–1939. His adviser described his dissertation as "no more than a solid, conscientious piece of work, critical of Polish and British policies, but not beyond what the evidence would tolerate". The American historian Peter Baldwin noted that Hoggan's dissertation, The Breakdown of German-Polish Relations in 1939: The Conflict Between the German New Order and the Polish Idea of Central Eastern Europe, was easily the most reasonable and sane of all Hoggan's writings.

During his time at Harvard, Hoggan befriended Harry Elmer Barnes, whose thinking would have much influence on Hoggan. Subsequently, Hoggan had a series of teaching positions at the University of Munich, San Francisco State College, the University of California at Berkeley, the Massachusetts Institute of Technology, and Carthage College. When teaching at Munich between 1949 and 1952, Hoggan became fluent in German and married a German woman. Reflecting his pro-German tendencies, in a 1960 review of a book by an Austrian writer Hans Uebersberger, Hoggan claimed that the assassination of Archduke Franz Ferdinand was a result of a conspiracy involving the governments of Serbia and Russia, and that as such, Austria-Hungary and its ally Germany were the victims of a Russo-Serbian provocation designed to cause a world war.

Der erzwungene Krieg
In 1955, Barnes encouraged Hoggan to turn his dissertation into a book and it was published in West Germany as Der erzwungene Krieg (The Forced War). It blamed the outbreak of World War II on an alleged Anglo-Polish conspiracy to wage aggression against Germany. Hoggan charged the alleged conspiracy was headed by the British Foreign Secretary Lord Halifax, who, Hoggan contended, had seized control of British foreign policy in October 1938 from Prime Minister Neville Chamberlain who was allegedly assisted by Polish Foreign Minister Colonel Józef Beck in what Hoggan called a monstrous anti-German plot. In Hoggan’s opinion, after the Munich Agreement, an obsessively anti-German Lord Halifax decided to wage a war of annihilation against the German people. Hoggan argued that Hitler's foreign policy was entirely peaceful and moderate, and that it was Nazi Germany that was in Hoggan's opinion an innocent victim of Anglo-Polish aggression in 1939:

[Hitler] had made more moderate demands on Poland than many leading American and British publicists had recommended in the years after Versailles. Moreover, Hitler had offered in return an amazing concession to Poland that the Weimar Republic would never even remotely countenance.

The crux of Hoggan's thesis was presented when he wrote:

In London, Halifax succeeded in forcing on the British Government a deliberate policy of war despite the fact that most of the prominent British experts on Germany argued for a policy of German-English friendship. In Warsaw, Beck was prepared to collaborate fully with Halifax's war plans despite the warnings from numerous Poles who were horrified by the prospect of seeing their land destroyed.

German, Italian, French, and other European leaders did all they could to avert the great catastrophe, but in vain, while Halifax's war policy, accompanied by the secret blessings of Roosevelt and Stalin, carried the day...

The Second World War arose from the attempt to destroy Germany.

Hoggan claimed that Britain was guilty of aggression against the German people.  Moreover, Hoggan accused the Polish government of engaging in what he called hideous persecution of its German minority, and claimed that the Polish government's policies towards the ethnic German minority were far worse than the Nazi regime's policies towards the Jewish minority. Moreover, Hoggan charged that all of the German anti-Semitic laws were forced on the Germans by anti-Semitism in Poland as in Hoggan's opinion German anti-Semitic laws were the only thing that stopped the entire Jewish population of Poland from immigrating to the Reich. Hoggan justified the huge one billion Reich-mark fine imposed on the entire Jewish community in Germany after the 1938 Kristallnacht pogrom as a reasonable measure to prevent what he called "Jewish profiteering" at the expense of German insurance companies and alleged that no Jews were killed in the Kristallnacht (in fact, 91 German Jews died). A particular area of controversy centered around Hoggan’s claim that the situation of German Jewry before World War II was extremely favorable to the Jewish community in Germany, and that none of the various antisemitic laws and measures of the Nazis had any deleterious effects on German Jews.

Hoggan argued that because German-Jewish doctors and dentists as late as 1938 could still participate in the German national insurance program that proved that Nazi anti-Semitism was not that harsh. Critics of Hoggan such as Deborah Lipstadt contend that Hoggan ignored the efforts on the part of the Nazi regime to stop "Aryan" Germans from seeing Jewish physicians and dentists throughout the 1930s, and that in July 1938 a law was passed withdrawing the licenses from Jewish doctors. Likewise, Hoggan argued that because in an American State Department cable of September 1938 from the American Embassy in Berlin mentioned that 10% of all German lawyers were Jews, that this proved the mildness of Nazi anti-Semitism. Lipstadt argued that Hoggan was guilty of selective quotation since the entire message concerns the discriminatory laws against German Jewish lawyers such as banning Jewish lawyers from serving as notaries. Moreover, Lipstadt noted that Hoggan ignored the reason for the message, namely that on September 27, 1938 German Jews were forbidden to practice law in Germany. Another area of criticism concerned Hoggan's treatment of the decision to end Judaism as an officially recognized religion in Germany. In Germany, the government had traditionally imposed a religion tax in which the proceeds were turned over to one's faith organization. In the Nazi era, Jews continued to pay the tax, but synagogues no longer received the proceeds. Hoggan claimed that this meant that synagogues could not "profit" at the expense of non-Jewish Germans, and falsely presented this move as mere secularization measure (Christian churches continued to receive the proceeds of the religion tax in Nazi Germany).

In the early 1960s, Hoggan's book attracted much attention, and was the subject of a cover story in Der Spiegel magazine in its May 13, 1964 edition. Hoggan's thesis of Germany as victim of aggression was widely attacked as simply wrong-headed. In regards to his sympathies, it was argued that Hoggan was an ardent Germanophile and a compulsive Anglophobe, Polophobe, and an anti-Semite.

Further fanning the flames of the criticism was the revelation that Hoggan had received his research funds from and that he himself was a member of several neo-Nazi groups in the United States and West Germany, and the charge that Hoggan had wilfully misinterpreted and falsified historical evidence to fit his argument. Another source of controversy with Hoggan's choice of publisher, the firm of Grabert Verlag which was run by former Nazi named Herbert Grabert, who had led a neo-pagan cult before World War II, had served as an official in Alfred Rosenberg's Ministry of the East during the war, and after the war made little secret of his beliefs about what he regarded as the rightness of Germany's cause during the war. When Der erzwungene Krieg was translated into English in 1989, it was published by the Institute for Historical Review.

In a critical review of Hoggan's book, the British historian Frank Spencer took issue with Hoggan's claim that all of the incidents that occurred in Danzig (modern Gdańsk, Poland) in 1939 were Polish provocations of Germany egged on by Britain. Spencer noted that all of the incidents were cases of German provocations of Poland rather than vice versa, and that the Poles would have defended their rights in Danzig regardless of what British policy was. Likewise, Spencer took issue with Hoggan's claim that the Reich Protectorate of Bohemia-Moravia was a generous German move to offer autonomy to the Czechs, and thought that Hoggan's complaint that it was most unjust that German minorities in Eastern Europe did not enjoy the same "autonomy" that Hitler offered to the Czechs in March 1939 to be simply laughable. Spencer noted that Hoggan's claim that Hitler's order on April 3, 1939 to begin planning for Fall Weiss was not a sign of moderation on the part of Hitler as Hoggan claimed, and noted Hoggan simply ignored the German Foreign Office's  instructions to ensure that all German-Polish talks over Danzig issue failed by making unreasonable demands on the Poles. In particular, Spencer argued against Hoggan's claim that the German-Soviet Non-Aggression Pact was not designed to partition Poland, but was instead a thoughtful attempt on the part of Joachim von Ribbentrop to persuade Joseph Stalin to abandon the idea of world revolution.

The American historian Donald Detwiler wrote that for Hoggan, Hitler was a basically reasonable statesman who tried to undo an unjust Treaty of Versailles. Detwiler went on to write that Hoggan's book was "false" and "vicious" in its conclusion that Britain was the aggressor and Germany the victim in 1939.

Andreas Hillgruber, one of Germany's leading military-diplomatic historians, noted that there was a certain "kernel of truth" to Hoggan's thesis, in that Hitler and Ribbentrop believed that attacking Poland in 1939 would not result in a British declaration of war against the Reich, but went on to argue that the major point of Hoggan's argument that Britain was seeking a war to destroy Germany was simply a "preposterous" misreading of history.

In a lengthy letter to the editor of the American Historical Review in 1964, Rothfels exposed the Nazi background of Hoggan's patrons. Another leading critic was the U.S. historian Gerhard Weinberg, who wrote a harsh book review in the October 1962 edition of the American Historical Review. Weinberg noted that Hoggan's method involved taking of all Hitler's "peace speeches" at face value, and ignored evidence in favor of German intentions for aggression, such as the Hossbach Memorandum. Moreover, Weinberg noted that Hoggan often rearranged events in a chronology to support his thesis, such as placing the Polish rejection of the German demand for the return of the Free City of Danzig (modern Gdańsk, Poland) to the Reich in October 1938 in 1939, thereby giving a false impression that the Polish refusal to consider changing the status of Danzig was due to British pressure. Finally, Weinberg noted that Hoggan had appeared to engage in forgery by manufacturing documents and attributing statements that were not found in documents in the archives. As an example, Weinberg noted during a meeting between Neville Chamberlain and Adam von Trott zu Solz in June 1939, Hoggan had Chamberlain saying that the British guarantee of Polish independence given in March 1939: "did not please him personally at all. He thereby gave the impression that Halifax was solely responsible for British policy". As Weinberg noted, what Chamberlain actually said in response to criticism from Trott zu Solz of the Polish guarantee was: "Do you [Trott zu Solz] believe that I undertook these commitments gladly? Hitler forced me into them!" In response, Barnes and Hoggan wrote a series of letters attempting to rebut Weinberg's arguments, who in his turn wrote letters replying to and rebutting the arguments of Hoggan and Barnes. The exchanges between Hoggan and Barnes on one side and Weinberg on the other became increasingly rancorous and vitriolic to such an extent that in October 1963 the editors of the American Historical Review announced that they would cease publishing letters relating to Hoggan's book in the interest of decorum.

In a 1963 article, the German historian Helmut Krausnick, who was one of the leading scholars associated with the Institute for Contemporary History, accused Hoggan of manufacturing much of his "evidence". Krausnick commented: "rarely have so many inane and unwarrented theses, allegations, and 'conclusions' ... been crammed into a volume written under the guise of history". Hoggan's former professors at Harvard described his book as bearing no resemblance to the PhD dissertation that he had submitted in 1948. Another point of criticism was the decision of two German historical societies to award Hoggan the Leopold von Ranke and Ulrich von Hutten Prizes for outstanding scholarship; many, such as the historian Gordon A. Craig felt that by honouring Hoggan, these societies had destroyed the value of the awards. The Berliner Tagesspiegel newspaper criticized "these spectacular honors for a historical distortion". The German Trade Union Council and the Association of German Writers both passed resolutions condemning the awards, while the Minister of the Interior in the Bundestag called the awards a "crude impertinence". In a letter, Rothfels commented that most of the people associated with the two historical societies had a "clear-cut Nazi past".

Support for Hoggan came from the historian Kurt Glaser, after examining The Forced War and its critics' arguments in Der Zweite Weltkrieg und die Kriegsschuldfrage (The Second World War and the Question of War Guilt), found, that while some criticisms had merit, "It is hardly necessary to repeat here that Hoggan was not attacked because he had erred here and there—albeit some of his errors are material—but because he had committed heresy against the creed of historical Orthodoxy." The German historian and philosopher Ernst Nolte has often defended Hoggan as one of the great historians of World War II. The Italian historian Rosaria Quartararo praised Der erzwungene Krieg as "perhaps still ... the best general account from the German side" of the period immediately before World War II.  Hoggan's mentor, Barnes, besides helping Hoggan turn his dissertation into the book Der erzwungene Krieg wrote a glowing blurb for the book's jacket.

In 1976, the book March 1939: the British Guarantee to Poland by the British historian Simon K. Newman was published. Newman's thesis was somewhat similar to Hoggan's in that he argued that Britain was willing to risk a war with Germany in 1939, though Newman's book differed sharply from Hoggan's in that besides being based upon British archives that were closed in the 1950s, it was Neville Chamberlain rather than Lord Halifax who was seen as driving British foreign policy. Newman denied there was ever a policy of appeasement as popularly understood. Newman maintained that British foreign policy under Chamberlain aimed at denying Germany a "free hand" anywhere in Europe, and to the extent that concessions were offered they were due to military weaknesses, compounded by the economic problems of rearmament. Most controversially, Newman contended that the British guarantee to Poland in March 1939 was motivated by the desire to have Poland as a potential anti-German ally, thereby blocking the chance for a German-Polish settlement of the Danzig (modern Gdańsk, Poland) question by encouraging what Newman claimed was Polish obstinacy over the Danzig issue, and thus causing World War II. Newman argued that German-Polish talks on the question of returning Danzig had been going well until Chamberlain's guarantee, and that it was Chamberlain's intention to sabotage the talks as a way of causing an Anglo-German war. In Newman's opinion, the guarantee of Poland was meant by Chamberlain as a "deliberate challenge" to Germany in 1939. Newman wrote that World War II was not "Hitler's unique responsibility..." and rather contended that "Instead of a German war of aggrandizement, the war become one of Anglo-German rivalry for power and influence, the culmination of the struggle for the right to determine the future configuration of Europe". Newman's conclusions were controversial in their own right, and historians such as Anna Cienciala and Anita Prazmowska have published refutations of his conclusions.

Based upon extensive interviews with the former French foreign minister Georges Bonnet, Hoggan followed up Der erzwungene Krieg with Frankreichs Widerstand gegen den Zweiten Weltkrieg (France's Resistance to the Second World War) in 1963. In that book, Hoggan argued that the Third Republic had no quarrel with the Third Reich and had been forced by British pressure to declare war on Germany in 1939.

==The Myth of the 'New History==
In his 1965 book, The Myth of the 'New History': The Techniques and Tactics of the New Mythologists of American History, Hoggan attacked all of the so-called "mythologist" historians who justified dragging America into unnecessary wars with Germany twice in the 20th century. According to Hoggan, the "mythologists" were Anglophiles, Liberals, internationalists, and "anti-Christians" (by which Hoggan apparently meant Jews). Repeating his argument from Der erzwungene Krieg, Hoggan argued that Hitler was a man of peace who was "the victim of English Tory conspiracy in September 1939... Halifax conducted a single-minded campaign to plunge Germany into war and in such a way as to make Germany appear the guilty party". Hoggan again argued that, incited by Britain, Poland was planning to attack Germany in 1939, and went on to argue that Operation Barbarossa was a "preventive war" forced on Germany in 1941. Hoggan blamed the German defeat in World War II to Hitler's reluctance to rearm on the proper scale due to his alleged love of peace, and argued that Germany was defeated only because of overwhelming material odds, but praised the "grit and courage" of the Germans in resisting the Allied onslaught against them. In Hoggan's opinion, too many American historians were "slow to grasp the central British role in bringing about either the Second World War and the Cold War". In a review of The Myth of the 'New History''', the American historian Harvey Wish commented that the book appeared to be little but an isolationist, pro-German Anglophobic rant about the fact that the United States in alliance with Britain had fought Germany in the two world wars.

Holocaust denial
In following years, author Lucy Dawidowicz wrote that Hoggan maintained a close association with various neo-Nazi and Holocaust denial groups. In 1969 a short book was published called The Myth of the Six Million, denying the Holocaust. The book listed no author, but the work was by Hoggan, though published without his permission. This should not be confused with his earlier book of 1965 called The Myth of the 'New History, on America's wars. The Myth of the Six Million was published by the Noontide Press, a small Los Angeles-based publisher specializing in explicitly antisemitic literature owned and operated by  Willis Carto. Hoggan sued Carto in 1969 for publishing the book (written in 1960) without his permission; the case was settled out of court in 1973.The Myth of the Six Million was one of the first books, if not the first book, in the English language to promote Holocaust denial. In The Myth of the Six Million, Hoggan argued that all of the evidence for the Holocaust was manufactured after the war as a way of trying to justify what Hoggan called a war of aggression against Germany. The Myth of the Six Million was published with a foreword by "E.L. Anderson", which was apparently a pseudonym for Carto. As part of The Myth of the Six Million, there was an appendix comprising five articles first published in The American Mercury. The five articles were "Zionist Fraud" by Harry Elmer Barnes, "The Elusive Six Million" by Austin App, "Was Anne Frank's Diary a Hoax" by Teressa Hendry, "Paul Rassinier: Historical Revisionist" by Herbert C. Roseman, "The Jews that Aren't" by Leo Heiman, and a favorable review of Paul Rassinier's work by Barnes.

Hoggan was accused in The Myth of the Six Million of re-arranging words from documents to support his contentions. One of Hoggan's critics, Lucy Dawidowicz, used the example of the memoirs of an Austrian Social Democrat named , imprisoned at Buchenwald concentration camp and later at the Auschwitz death camp, who wrote: "I should now like briefly to refer to the gas chambers. Though I did not see them myself, they have been described to me by so many trustworthy people that I have no hesitation in reproducing their testimony". Dawidowicz accused Hoggan of re-arranging the sentence to make it sound like Kautsky declared they were no gas chambers at Auschwitz rather than declaring that he had not seen them but only heard of them by hearsay.

In the 1970s, Hoggan turned to writing about American history in German. Hoggan's books about American history, his Der unnötige Krieg (The Unnecessary War) and the Das blinde Jahrhundert (The Blind Century) series, have been described as "a massive and bizarre critique of the course of American history from a racialist and wildly anti-Semitic perspective".

In the 1980s, Hoggan was a leading member of the Institute for Historical Review (IHR) and a featured speaker at the IHR's Sixth Conference in 1985. His work has remained popular with antisemitic groups.

Final years
During his final years David Hoggan lived with his wife in Menlo Park, California. He died there of a heart attack on 7 August 1988. Hoggan's last book, published posthumously in 1990, was Meine Anmerkungen zu Deutschland: Der Anglo-amerikanische Kreuzzugsgedanke im 20. Jahrhundert (My comments on Germany: The Anglo-American crusade idea in the 20th century) which detailed what he claimed were Germany's innocence in and incredible suffering in both world wars due to an anti-German Anglo-American "crusader mentality" due to an "envy" of German economic success.

Work
Books
 Der erzwungene Krieg. Tübingen: Grabert Verlag (1961).
 Translated into English as The Forced War : When Peaceful Revision Failed. Costa Mesa, Calif.: Institute for Historical Review (1989). .
 Frankreichs Widerstand gegen den Zweiten Weltkrieg. Tübingen: Verlag der Deutschen Hochschullehrer-Zeitung (1963).
 The Myth of the Six Million. Los Angeles, Calif.: Noontide Press (1969). .
 Der unnötige Krieg. Tübingen: Grabert Verlag (1976).
 Das blinde Jahrhundert: Amerika—das messianische Unheil. Tübingen: Grabert Verlag (1979).
 Das blinde Jahrhundert: Europa—Die verlorene Weltmitte. Tübingen: Grabert Verlag (1984).
 The Myth of New History Techniques and Tactics of Mythologists. Costa Mesa, Calif.: Institute for Historical Review (1985). .
 Meine Anmerkungen zu Deutschland: Der Anglo-amerikanische Kreuzzugsgedanke im 20. Jahrhundert. Tübingen: Grabert Verlag (1990).

Articles
 "President Roosevelt and the Origins of the 1939 War." Journal of Historical Review, vol. 4, no. 2, Special Issue: Roosevelt and War in Europe, 1938-1940 (Summer 1983), pp. 205–255.

Reviews
 Review of Oesterreich Zwischen Russland und Serbien: Zur Suedslawischen Frage und der Entstehung des Ersten Weltkrieges by Hans Uebersberger. Journal of Modern History, vol. 32, no. 1 (Mar. 1960), p. 87.

References
Notes

Bibliography
Craig, Gordon (1991) The Germans, New York: Meridian. 
Dawidowicz, Lucy (December 1980) "Lies About the Holocaust"  from Commentary, Volume 70, Issue # 6, pp. 31–37; reprinted in What Is The Use of Jewish history? : Essays, edited and with an introduction by Neal Kozodoy, New York : Schocken Books, 1992, pages 84–100. 
Lipstadt, Deborah (1993) Denying the Holocaust: The Growing Assault on Truth and Memory, New York : Free Press ; Toronto : Maxwell Macmillan Canada ; New York ; Oxford : Maxwell Macmillan International, 
Spencer, Frank (July 1965) Review of Der erzwungene Kriegin International Affairs, Volume 41, #3,  pp. 506–07 
Weinberg, Gerhard (October 1962) Review of Der erzwungene Krieg pages 104-105 from The American Historical Review, Volume 68, No. 1, pp. 104–05
Wish, Harvey (January 1966) Review of The Myth of the 'New History': The Techniques and Tactics of the New Mythologists of American History in The American Historical Review'', Volume 71, Issue #2, pages 658-659.

External links
The Forced War - When Peaceful Revision Failed
The Forced War from Internet Archive
A Brief History of Holocaust Denial
The Origins of the Second World War Reflections on Three Approaches to the Problem 

1923 births
1988 deaths
Reed College alumni
Harvard University alumni
University of California, Berkeley faculty
American Holocaust deniers
Carthage College faculty
San Francisco State University faculty
Massachusetts Institute of Technology faculty
People from Menlo Park, California
20th-century American historians
20th-century American male writers
Activists from California
Far-right politics in the United States
American conspiracy theorists
Historians from California
American male non-fiction writers
American expatriates in Germany